Iva is a genus of wind-pollinated plants in the family Asteraceae, described as a genus by Linnaeus in 1753. Plants of this genus are known generally as marsh elders. The genus is native to North America.

 Accepted species
 Iva angustifolia - southeastern + south-central United States (Texas Oklahoma Louisiana Arkansas Kansas Florida)
 Iva annua - United States, primarily south-central region; Tamaulipas
 Iva asperifolia - south-central United States (Texas Oklahoma Louisiana Arkansas Kansas Indiana), Veracruz
 Iva axillaris - western United States + Canada
 Iva cheiranthifolia - Cuba
 Iva ciliata - south-central United States
 Iva corbinii B.L. Turner - Texas
 Iva dealbata - United States (Texas New Mexico), Mexico (Chihuahua, Coahuila, Nuevo León, San Luis Potosí)
 Iva frutescens - coastal areas from Texas to Nova Scotia
 Iva hayesiana - California, Baja California
 Iva imbricata - coastal areas from Texas to Virginia; Bahamas
 Iva microcephala  - southeastern United States (Alabama Florida Georgia North Carolina South Carolina)
 Iva xanthiifolia (synonym Cyclachaena xanthiifolia) - widespread in United States + Canada, introduced elsewhere

References

External links
 GRIN genus Iva

Asteraceae genera
Iva (plant)